Harry Thomas "Shadow" Pyle (November 29, 1861 – December 26, 1908), was a professional baseball player who played pitcher in the Major Leagues for the 1884 Philadelphia Quakers and the 1887 Chicago White Stockings. He played in the minor leagues from 1883–1890.

External links

1861 births
1908 deaths
Major League Baseball pitchers
Philadelphia Quakers players
Chicago White Stockings players
19th-century baseball players
Wilmington Quicksteps (minor league) players
Lancaster Ironsides players
Newark Domestics players
Richmond Virginians (minor league) players
Newark Little Giants players
LaCrosse Freezers players
Jersey City Skeeters players
Reading (minor league baseball) players
Wilmington Blue Hens players
Baseball players from Pennsylvania
Sportspeople from Reading, Pennsylvania